The 9th Annual ASTRA Awards was an event held on Thursday, 21 July 2011 at the Sydney Theatre. The ASTRA Pioneer Award and the ASTRA Industry Excellence Awards were presented prior to the ceremony at the annual ASTRA Conference, also held in Sydney, on 29 March 2011.

ASTRA Pioneer Award
The second annual ASTRA Pioneer Award was presented to David Malone, CEO of the Premier Media Group.

ASTRA Industry Excellence Awards

Platform Marketing

Program and Channel Promotion

Technology

References

External links
 Official website of the ASTRA Awards
 Official website of the Australian Subscription Television and Radio Association (ASTRA)

ASTRA Awards
2011 in Australian television
2011 television awards